The Hwange Thermal Power Station is the biggest power plant in Zimbabwe with an installed capacity of 920 MW. It is owned and operated by the national electricity company Zimbabwe Electricity Supply Authority. It was built in two stages and consists of 4 units of 120 MW each and 2 units of 220 MW each. Engineering Consultants, Merz & McLellan, were employed for the design and supervision of the construction of the power station. Construction of Stage 1 commenced in 1973, but was suspended in 1975 due to economic sanctions imposed on Rhodesia. Stage 1's units were commissioned from 1983 to 1986 with Stage 2's units following in 1986 and1987.

A reliable source of water lies further north, in the Zambezi River. About  of raw water can be provided every day.

Coal reserves estimated to support 1,200 MW for an estimated 30 years are concealed beneath the vast expanse of the coal mine.

Technical problems due to neglect of maintenance, part replacement and upgrading make the plant prone to frequent production stops. In 2009, Namibia's NamPower made agreements to help ZESA to revive the plant's capacity in exchange for power deliveries. The extensive problems are however continuing and have even led the government to considering a full closure of the plant. In April 2008, Chadha Power of India secured a contract to refurbish four units at the power plant.

In December 2015 China agreed to provide a $1.2 billion loan to add 600 MW of generating capacity to the Hwange power station with two additional units.

Recent developments
As of July 2021, the upgrade of adding Unit 7 and Unit 8, each with capacity of 300 megawatts was about 68 percent complete, with commercial commissioning expected in 2022. The contract price of the upgrade is quoted as US$1.5 billion. In March 2022, the Zimbabwe Herald reported that work completion had progressed to 82 percent, as of then.

See also
 List of power stations in Zimbabwe

References

External links

 IndustCards - Coal-Fired Power Plants in Africa, retrieved 22 March 2010.

Coal-fired power stations in Zimbabwe
Matabeleland North Province